This is a partial list of piano manufacturers. Most piano professionals have access to detailed information about these brands using a Piano Atlas to reference serial numbers, which are used to determine a piano's age using the year a piano was built.  This information is often used in piano appraisals.

Active brands or companies

Defunct brands or companies

See also 

 List of piano brand names
 Liste von Klavierbauern (List of German Piano Manufacturers)

References

External links
 The Pierce Piano Atlas
 Fabricantes de pianos en España (Spanish piano manufacturers)

Lists of musical instrument manufacturing companies